Nayagam may refer to:

 John Nayagam, actor
 S. M. Nayagam, Sri Lankan cinema pioneer
 Xavier S. Thani Nayagam (1913-1980), Tamil scholar

Tamil masculine given names